The SPL Pohjois-Suomen piiri (Northern Finland Football Association) is one of the 12 district organisations of the Football Association of Finland. It administers lower tier football in Northern Finland.

Background 

Suomen Palloliitto Pohjois-Suomen piiri, commonly referred to as SPL Pohjois-Suomen piiri or SPL Pohjois-Suomi, is the governing body for football in Northern Finland.  Based in Oulu, the Association's Director is Esa Saajanto.

Member clubs

League Competitions 
SPL Pohjois-Suomen piiri run the following league competitions:

Men's Football
 Division 3 - Kolmonen  -  one section
 Division 4 - Nelonen  -  two sections
 Division 5 - Vitonen  -  one section

Ladies Football
 Division 3 - Kolmonen  -  one section

Footnotes

References

External links 
 SPL Pohjois-Suomen piiri Official Website 

P